Echo Park is a neighborhood in the east-central region of Los Angeles, California. Located to the northwest of Downtown, it is bordered by Silver Lake to the west and Chinatown to the east. The culturally diverse neighborhood has become known for its trendy local businesses, as well as its popularity with artists, musicians and creatives. It has been home to numerous notable people. The neighborhood is centered on the lake and park of the same name.

History

Edendale

Established in 1892, and long before Hollywood became synonymous with the commercial film industry of the United States, the area of Echo Park known as Edendale was the center of filmmaking on the West Coast.

By the 1910s, several film studios were operating on Allesandro Avenue (now Glendale Boulevard) along the Echo Park-Silverlake border, including the Selig Polyscope Company, Mack Sennett's Keystone Studios, the Pathe West Coast Film Studio, and others.

Silent film stars who worked in the Edendale studios included Mabel Normand, Fatty Arbuckle, and Harold Lloyd, and Gloria Swanson. Charlie Chaplin's first film was made at Keystone Studios, as well as the very first feature-length comedy, which starred Charlie Chaplin and Mabel Normand.

The first pie-in-the-face scene was filmed at what later became the Mack Sennett Studios on Glendale Boulevard near Effie Street. The complex, which is now part of a storage facility, dates from 1909 and includes one of the area's first permanent sound stages, the factories where movies are made. The former studio, 1712 Glendale Boulevard, is City of Los Angeles Historic-Cultural Monument No. 256.

Echo Park Lake
Echo Park Lake's earliest use by the city was as a reservoir. The Los Angeles Canal and Reservoir Co. formed Reservoir No. 4 in 1868. The company obtained the water by digging a ditch that sent water flowing from the Los Angeles River — in the area now known as Los Feliz — along a zigzag path that emptied into the reservoir.

In 1891 the four owners of the surrounding area gave up 33 acres (13 ha) of land to the city around the reservoir so that it could be used as a park. The city began work landscaping the park in October 1892. City parks superintendent Joseph Henry Tomlinson is recognized for coining the name of the new park, which later became the name of the neighborhood. He chose the name because of echoes he heard during the construction of Echo Park Lake in 1892. By 1895, the park and accompanying boathouse were completed.

By the late 1910s, motion picture companies on Allesandro Street, now Glendale Boulevard, had been using the park as a filming location. City leaders responded by barring Keystone Studios, home of the Keystone Cops, from shooting any of its comedies at the lake, on the grounds that too many flowers were being trampled.

Echo Park Lake was identified as an impaired body of water in 2006, and the city allocated $64.7 million to fund its cleanup and revitalization. The lake was closed off and drained in the summer of 2011 when renovation work began. The rehabilitation project tackled Echo Park Lake not only as a recreational body of water, but also as an important part of the Los Angeles ecosystem. Although Echo Park Lake is man-made, it is part of the local watershed. The lake reopened on June 5, 2013, after a $45 million renovation.

Starting in November 2019, a growing population of homeless people began moving into tents in the park, eventually covering the northwest corner of the facility and the entire west bank by the lake. On March 25, 2021, the park was closed for renovations and cleared of the homeless encampments. This was done to address the high increase of the homeless population throughout the park and repair any damages. Closure notices were posted throughout the park days before the sweep, but a crowd of over 200 protesters met LAPD. According to Mitch O'Farrell, more than 120 people experiencing homelessness at Echo Park Lake were successfully moved into transitional housing. This situation has caused tension between neighbors on how to handle the homeless problem in Los Angeles properly.

Transportation

Glendale Freeway termination 

In 1962, as a result of this local community opposition, the full build-out plan was rescinded and construction was terminated at the present SR-2 terminus near Glendale Bl and Duane Street. Since then, commuter traffic exiting and entering on to SR-2 has passed through the community, primarily along Glendale Bl and Alvarado Street, which has contributed to congestion. Since that plan has been scrapped, the freeway is somewhat isolated from the remainder of the Los Angeles freeway system. There have been proposals to turn the freeway stub into a sort of public park.

Pacific Electric Railway

The Pacific Electric Railway, better known as the Red Cars, used to run through Echo Park along the center of Glendale Boulevard. The citywide system of electric trolleys began with the dawn of the 20th century, ultimately spinning a web of rail that linked cities in Los Angeles, Orange, San Bernardino and Riverside counties. It was the largest and most advanced public transit system in the world at the time.

The Red Car system was sold to Metropolitan Coach Lines, whose executive, Jesse Haugh, had connections to a public transportation company funded by General Motors and other auto-related industries. The Red Cars faded out of service not long afterwards, with the Los Angeles-Glendale-Burbank Line that traveled through Echo Park officially ending service on June 19, 1955.

Gangs 
Echo Park has been infamous as being a hot spot for gang activity. This was true in the 1980s and 1990s, but in the early 2010s as the neighborhood began gentrifying, rents started to skyrocket, and a controversial gang injunction forced gang members to move outside their turf, instances of gang violence waned.

In 2013, a Los Angeles judge signed off on a permanent gang injunction aimed at six rival gangs in the Echo Park area, creating what authorities call a "safety zone" for the area. The injunction targets the members of six gangs, namely Echo Park Locos, the Crazys, the Big Top Locos, the Diamond Street Locos, Frogtown Rifa, and Head Hunters. The perimeter for the safety zone is roughly bound by the Los Angeles River to the north, the 110 Freeway to the east, Beverly Boulevard to south and Glendale Boulevard to the west. It includes Echo Park Lake park and Dodger Stadium.

The injunction, a civil order, prohibits two or more listed gang members from associating in any way in public or in common areas like courtyards. It also allows for stricter penalties if any listed gang member is caught with drugs, alcohol, guns or vandalizing property.

Geography
Echo Park has many rolling hills and valleys with a few flat areas like Echo Park Lake. Its main commercial corridors are Sunset and Glendale boulevards.

Location 
According to the Los Angeles Times "Mapping L.A." project, Echo Park is in Central Los Angeles, between Hollywood and Downtown Los Angeles. It is situated near the 101, the 2, and the 5 freeways. Echo Park is flanked by Elysian Valley to the north and northeast, Elysian Park to the east, Chinatown and Downtown to the southeast, Westlake to the southwest and west, and Silver Lake to the northwest.

Boundaries are the Golden State Freeway–Glendale Freeway interchange at the north apex, Riverside Drive on the northeast, Elysian Park neighborhood on the east, Stadium Way and Beaudry Avenue on the southeast, the south apex being Beaudry Avenue and West Second Street and the west limit being an irregular line consisting of Second Street and Beverly Boulevard, then moving upward north along Benton Way and the Glendale Freeway.

Climate
Being in the central part of Los Angeles, Echo Park experiences a hot-summer Mediterranean climate (Csa). Temperatures here are almost identical to that of Downtown Los Angeles.

Districts

Within Echo Park are the following:

Angelino Heights

Angelino Heights is most notable for its Victorian era residences, although these are few in number.

Elysian Heights

Since the 1910s, Elysian Heights, along with Edendale, has been home to many of the counter-culture, political radicals, artists, writers, architects and filmmakers. The children of many progressives attended school there during the 1930s, 1940s and 1950s.

Temple–Beaudry or Central City West

Temple–Beaudry forms a triangle south of the Hollywood Freeway, east of Glendale Boulevard, and west of Beaudry. Settled in the late 1800s as a residential neighborhood, many of the residences were torn down as part of slum clearance in preparation for a high school, which was instead turned into Vista Hermosa Park, and in anticipations of the expansion of the Downtown business district west across the Harbor Freeway, for which some promoters used the term "Central City West" around 1990 for this area plus the area to its south, immediately west of the Harbor Freeway and as far south as Olympic Boulevard.

Population

2000
The 2000 U.S. census counted 40,455 residents in the  neighborhood—an average of 16,868 people per square mile, one of the highest densities in Los Angeles and among the highest densities for the county. In 2008 the city estimated that the population had increased to 43,832. The median age for residents was 30, about the same as the city norm.

Echo Park was considered moderately diverse ethnically. The breakdown was Latinos, 64%; Asians, 18.8%; whites, 12.9%; blacks, 2%, and others, 2.3%. Mexico (41.3%) and El Salvador (15.2%) were the most common places of birth for the 53% of the residents who were born abroad, a figure that was considered high compared to the city as a whole.

2008
The median household income in 2008 dollars was $37,708, a low figure for Los Angeles, and a high percentage of households earned $20,000 or less. The average household size of three people was about the same as the rest of the city. Renters occupied 76% of the housing units, and house- or apartment owners the rest.

The percentages of never-married men and women, 46.8% and 38.3%, respectively, were among the county's highest. The 2000 census found 5,325 families headed by single parents, a high rate for both the city and the county. There were 1,034 military veterans in 2000, or 3.5%, a low figure for Los Angeles.

2010
Census data below for is cited from only US Census District 1974.20.  It does not include a large portion Echo Park. 

The 2010 US Census estimates that the neighborhood demographics for tract 1974.20 are as follows: Latinos still form the majority of the community, though the percentage fell from 69.8% in 2000 to 59.5% in 2010; Whites grew from 13.2% in 2000 to 23.2% in 2010; Asian population remained almost unchanged at 13.3% in 2010 compared to 13.2% in 2000; Other grew from 3.4% in 2000 to 4% in 2010. The number of people in the district shrank by almost 15% to around 3500 people. This represents less than 10% of the number of residents considered to live in Echo Park. The demographic shift from Latino to White is generally acknowledged as the overall trend in the area.

2019
Data collected by Greater Los Angeles Homeless Count in 2019 show that Echo Park's homeless population is 367 (0.9%).

Parks and recreation

Parks

Elysian Park
Elysian Park is one of the largest in Los Angeles at 600 acres (240 ha). It is also the city's oldest park, founded in 1886 by the Elysian Park Enabling Ordinance. Most of Elysian Park falls in the Eastern neighborhood of the same name, but a small portion of the park does fall in Echo Park.
 Angels Point, a small hill in Elysian Park overlooking Dodger Stadium and the Downtown Los Angeles Skyline. Atop the hill is a large metal sculpture art installation by local artist Peter Shire of the 1980s postmodern Memphis Group.
 Chavez Ravine Arboretum, opened in 1893 and contains more than 100 varieties of trees from around the world, including what are believed to be the oldest and largest Cape Chestnut, Kauri, and Tipu trees in the United States.
 Grace E. Simons Lodge, an event space with waterfalls and reception rooms.
 Marion Harlow Memorial Grove is a small tree and plant grove along the Elysian Park hiking trail.

Echo Park Lake
Originally built in the 1860s as a reservoir for drinking water, today Echo Park Lake is a Los Angeles icon that functions primarily as a detention basin in the city's storm drain system, while providing recreational benefits and wildlife habitat. Echo Park Lake also plays host to community events, such as the annual Lotus Festival every July.
 Echo Park boathouse restaurant and more than a dozen swan shaped paddle boats
 Picnic tables, BBQ pits, public restrooms, water fountains, and grassy picnic areas
 1 mile long looping promenade paved walking trail around the lake

A major renovation was completed in 2013. Beginning in 2019, the shores of the lake spawned a homeless encampment that became a "flashpoint in L.A's homelessness crisis."

As of March 25, 2021, the park was closed indefinitely for renovations. It reopened on May 26, 2021, after the tents were removed.

Vista Hermosa Natural Park

A  urban natural park which features walking trails, streams, meadows, oak savannahs, picnic grounds, sweeping views of Downtown Los Angeles skyline, and a nature-themed playground amidst native Mediterranean vegetation. It is built on former residential land in the Temple–Beaudry district, houses that were torn down as part of slum clearance efforts, and which originally was destined for use as the site of a high school.

Sports Facilities
 Chavez Ridge Disc Golf Course (in Elysian Park)
 Echo Park Deep Pool (indoor pool)
 Echo Park Recreation Complex
Facility Features: Baseball Diamond (Lighted), Basketball Courts (Lighted / Indoor), Basketball Courts (Lighted / Outdoor), Children's Play Area, Community Rooms, 6 Tennis Courts (Lighted), Stage, Picnic Tables, Indoor Gym (without Weights), Skate park (opening in 2020) 
 Echo Park Youth Center
 Elysian Fields (2 baseball diamonds in Elysian Park)
 Elysian Park Adaptive Recreation Center (in Elysian Park)
Facility Features: Basketball Courts (Unlighted / Outdoor), Children's Play Area, Indoor Gym (with Weights), Amphitheatre, Indoor Gym (without Weights), Classroom(s), Stage
 Vista Hermosa Synthetic Soccer Field (lighted)

Government and infrastructure

Local government
Echo Park resides in both Los Angeles City Council District 13 under Councilmember Mitch O'Farrell and Los Angeles City Council District 1 under Councilmember Gil Cedillo.

The Los Angeles Fire Department Station 20 is in the area.

The Los Angeles Police Department (LAPD) operates the Rampart Community Police Station at 1401 West 6th St., 90017, located near Echo Park in the Westlake district of east-central Los Angeles. LAPD also operates an
LAPD Police Academy training facility Including a weapons firing range in Elysian Park adjacent to Dodger Stadium.

Mitch O'Farrell is an American politician and member of the Los Angeles City Council representing the 13th district, including Echo Park. O'Farrell was elected on May 21, 2013, to succeed outgoing incumbent Eric Garcetti, the 42nd Mayor of Los Angeles. His office resides at 1722 Sunset Blvd. in Downtown Echo Park.

County, state, and federal representation
Echo Park sits in the following governmental districts:
 1st County District of Los Angeles County Board of Supervisors, under Supervisor Hilda Solis
 24th State Senate District, under California State Senator Maria Elena Durazo
 51st State District of the California State Assembly, under California State Assemblymember Wendy Carrillo
 28th Federal Congressional District, under Representative Adam Schiff

The Los Angeles County Department of Health Services operates the Central Health Center in Downtown Los Angeles, serving Echo Park.

The United States Postal Service Edendale Post Office is located at 1525 North Alvarado Street.

Maria Elena Durazo (born March 20, 1953) is an American politician serving in the California State Senate. A Democrat, she represents the 24th State Senate district, which encompasses Central Los Angeles and East Los Angeles, including Echo Park. Her District Office resides at 1808 Sunset Blvd. in Downtown Echo Park.

Education
Eighteen percent of residents 25 and older have a four-year degree, about average for the city and the county, but there is a high percentage of residents with less than a high school diploma.

In 2007, LAUSD used eminent domain to remove 50 homes in order to build a new school.

Within Echo Park are the following schools:

Elementary schools
 Baxter Montessori, 2101 North Echo Park Avenue (private)
 Elysian Heights Elementary, 1562 Baxter Street (LAUSD). This school was home to "Room 8 the Cat"
 Clifford Street Elementary, 2150 Duane Street (LAUSD)
 Mayberry Street Elementary, 2414 Mayberry Street (LAUSD)
 Golden West Christian, 1310 Liberty Street (private)
 Gabriella Charter, 1435 Logan Street (LAUSD)
 Logan Street Span School, 1711 West Montana Street (LAUSD)Serving K to 8th grade
 Rosemont Elementary, 421 N. Rosemont (LAUSD)
 Betty Plasencia Elementary School, 1321 Cortez Street (LAUSD)

Other schools
 DC Academy, 626 Coronado Terrace (private)

Public libraries
The Los Angeles Public Library operates two branches in Echo Park: Echo Park Branch and Edendale Branch.

Entertainment and night life

The trendy Echo Park area, known as one of "the city's hippest neighborhoods", has many bars, night clubs, and restaurants. The sprawling historic Taix French restaurant (originally known as Les Freres Taix) has been a landmark in the community since moving to 1911 Sunset Boulevard from downtown Los Angeles in 1964. The 321 Lounge cocktail bar inside the restaurant has hosted live music and comedy for many years and is a longtime destination for Los Angeles Dodgers fans to congregate before or after a baseball game.

Notable people

Veronica Porché Ali, psychologist and former wife of boxer Muhammad Ali.
 Carlos Almaraz, artist
 Austin Amelio, actor
 Conor Oberst, musician
 Allison Anders, film and television director
 Jackson Browne, musician
 Anna Camp, actress
Charlie Chaplin, actor, comedian, composer, writer, film director.
Frances Conroy, actress
Alice Cooper, musician
Jeffrey Davies, musician
Lana Del Rey, musician, model, music video director.
Mac DeMarco, musician
 Leonardo DiCaprio, actor
 William Ferguson (1822–1910), member of the Los Angeles Common Council
 Leanne Ford, interior designer, HGTV television show host
 Glenn Frey, musician
 Eric Garcetti, Los Angeles mayor
 Erica Garcia, Argentine rock singer-songwriter 
 Seth Green, actor
Kim Gruenenfelder, writer and congressional candidate
 Roy Hampton, Los Angeles City Council member, 1939–41
Hand Habits, musician
 Maurice Harris, celebrity florist, cafe owner
 Marilyn Horne, soprano, lived at 1565 Altivo Way
 John Huston, film director 
 Art Ingels, inventor of the Go-Kart
 Touko Laaksonen (AKA Tom of Finland), artist
 Paul Landacre, artist, lived at 2006 El Moran Street
 Sasha Lane, actress, model
 Shia LaBeouf, actor, writer, artist
 Solomon Lazard (1827–1916), entrepreneur, banker and politician
 Henry Jay Lewis, musical conductor
 Estelle Lawton Lindsey, newspaper columnist and Los Angeles City Council member, lived at 2414 Echo Park Avenue
 Edward Middleton Manigault, painter
 Aimee Semple McPherson, evangelist (created first megachurch) 
 Steve McQueen, actor, lived on Vestal Avenue in 1955
 Carey McWilliams author, editor and lawyer
 Phoebe Neidhardt, actress, comedian
 Alessandro Nivola, actor, bought and lived in Angelino Heights Victorian home in 2002
 Molly Parker, actress
 Lil Peep, musician lived here from 2016 to his death in 2017 
 Art Pepper, jazz musician
 Ariel Pink, musician
 Leo Politi, artist and illustrator
 James Wesley Potts, merchant, landowner and member of the Los Angeles Common Council; noted locally as an amateur weatherman nicknamed "The Prophet."
Margaret Qualley, actress, dancer.
 Sara Ramirez, actress
 Ann Robinson, actress and stunt horse rider
Horatio Sanz, comedian, actor, ex-SNL cast member and podcaster.
 Mack Sennett, writer, film producer, film director, studio executive
 Peter Shire, artist (80s Memphis Group postmodern pioneer)
 Sia, musician, writer
 Roger L. Simon, novelist and screenwriter. His fictional detective, Moses Wine, also lived in Echo Park.
 Grace E. Simons, a defender of Elysian Park 
 Brando Skyhorse, author, lived on Portia Street
 Elliott Smith (1969–2003), musician, singer, songwriter
 J. D. Souther, musician
 Avey Tare, musician
 Darwin William Tate, Los Angeles City Council member, 1933–39
 Danny Trejo, actor
 Valentina, drag queen
 Clare Vivier, fashion designer
 Eric Wareheim, actor, comedian
 Clara Kimball Young, silent film actress
 Frank Zappa, musician and songwriter, lived at 1819 Bellevue Ave
 Jake Zeitlin opened an antique book shop at 1623 Landa Street

In popular culture

Film
 Twenty Minutes of Love is a 1914 short silent film starring Charlie Chaplin, which takes place at Echo Park Lake.
 Recreation is a 1914 short silent film starring Charlie Chaplin, which takes place at Echo Park Lake.
 The Academy Award-winning  1974 film Chinatown by Director Roman Polanski has a scene taking place in Echo Park. In the movie's third-most-famous scene, Jake (Jack Nicholson) pretends to photograph his associate, as cover for snapping Hollis and Katherine, while boating on Echo Park Lake.
Echo Park is a 1986 American comedy drama film set in Echo Park. The plot follows several aspiring actors, musicians and models.
 Mi Vida Loca, is a 1993 American drama film directed and written by Allison Anders centered on young Mexicanas and Chicanas (and their male counterparts) growing up in Echo Park.
The Fast And The Furious is a 2001 American crime action-adventure film directed by Rob Cohen starring Paul Walker, Vin Diesel, & Michelle Rodriguez. Vin Diesel plays Dominic Toretto, a street racer who lives in Echo Park. Many scenes take place there including at Bob's Market in Angelino Heights and a meet up in the parking lot of Dodger Stadium.
Training Day is a 2001 American crime thriller film directed by Antoine Fuqua starring Denzel Washington and Ethan Hawke as two LAPD narcotics officers who patrol over a 12-hour period in the gang-ridden neighborhoods of Westlake, Echo Park and South Central Los Angeles.
 Quinceañera is a 2006 film about gentrification in Los Angeles, centered on Echo Park.
 Columbus Day (film) of 2009 has a recurring scene at the Echo Park Lake. 
 The Nicolas Winding Refn 2011 film Drive is set primarily in Echo Park. The main character, "The Driver" lives in Echo Park and meets many characters in and around the area.
 Echo Park is a 2014 drama romance film directed by Amanda Marsalis set in Echo Park.
A Star Is Born is a 2018 American musical drama film directed by Bradley Cooper starring Bradley Cooper and Lady Gaga. Lady Gaga's character, Ally, lives with her father in the Angelino Heights district of Echo Park.

Television
 The Bench Episode 004 with Huell Howser, filmed in 1996
 The main character Jimmy played by Stephen Falk in the 2014 FX show You're The Worst lives in Silver Lake, and much of Echo Park is featured in the show as the main characters visit nearby businesses.
 The 2016 Netflix series Love is primarily set in Echo Park.
 The 2017 reboot of the sitcom One Day at a Time is set in Echo Park.
 The television series Chuck is mainly set in Echo Park.

Literature
 Echo Park is a 2006 crime fiction novel set mostly in Echo Park. It's the 17th novel by American crime-writer Michael Connelly and the twelfth featuring the Los Angeles detective Hieronymus "Harry" Bosch.
 The award-winning book "The Madonnas of Echo Park: A Novel" by Brando Skyhorse follows a Hispanic family rattled by a tragic event in their home of Echo Park. The story focuses on the marginalized men and women who cook the meals, clean the homes, and struggle to lose their ethnic identity in the pursuit of the American dream. In 2012, HBO was in talks to produce a drama series based on the book.
 The Echo Park Coven Novels book series written by Buffy the Vampire Slayer actress Amber Benson which includes #1 The Witches of Echo Park (2015), #2 The Last Dream Keeper (2016), and #3 The End of Magic (2017) is a trilogy of fantasy novels about a coven of young witches that live in Echo Park.

Music
 Keith Barbour released an album, Echo Park, in 1969, which hit No. 163 on the Billboard 200, and the title track, written by Buzz Clifford, hit No. 40 on the Pop Singles chart.
 The 1976 song Carmelita by Warren Zevon references Echo Park by name and he sings of meeting his heroin dealer who "hangs out down on Alvarado Street by the Pioneer Chicken stand."
 The 1980s song "Echo Park" by Brian Setzer is a studio outtake released in 1999 and references the local lake, "I used to swim in Echo Park lake all night."
 The 2004 song "Echo Park" by Ryan Cabrera is about Echo Park with lyrics such as, "Today it rained in L.A....I'm leaving my heart here in Echo Park."
 The 2009 music video for the song "End Love" by the rock band OK Go was filmed in Echo Park and made one of the local geese a celebrity.
 The 2011 song "Echo Park" by Ximena Sarinana is about a man she likes from Echo Park who is a hipster and 'superficially cool.' with lyrics, "I thought he was ready to mend my broken heart...till someone reminds me that he lived in Echo Park" and in an interview Sariñana says, the reason for including Echo Park in the name and lyrics is a way to display 'a superficial motive for falling in love with someone.'
 The 2017 song "Scott Street" by Phoebe Bridgers is about Scott Avenue. It's a quaint residential stretch that the song's subject, Marshall, travelled to make a daily pilgrimage to buy cigarettes.
 The 2017 song "Up In Hudson" by Dirty Projectors about long-distance lovers mentions Echo Park in the lyrics, "And you're out in Echo Park, blasting 2Pac, drinking a fifth..."
 The 2018 song "King of Echo Park" by TV Girl is about Echo Park including the lyrics, "As the sun sets on Sunset" (Blvd), and "Now she's playing pool at the Little Joy." (a local bar)
 The 2018 song "Jaws" by Bladee mentions the location twice in the lyrics, "Night call, Echo Park"
 The 2019 song "Echo Park" by Bedouine is about Echo Park with lyrics including, "Where everybody's avant-garde," "Long as my rent don't climb, I'm living in Echo Park," (Echo Park's demographic began heavily shifting in 2000 and rents reached an all-time high by 2017) and "Oh, I long to be at the fountain and the lake."
The 2022 song "Echo Park" by Tim Baker.

See also

 List of Los Angeles Historic-Cultural Monuments in Silver Lake, Angelino Heights, and Echo Park
 List of districts and neighborhoods in Los Angeles

Notes and references

External links

 Echo Park Historical Society
 The Eastsider LA A news source for Echo Park and surrounding neighborhoods
 Echo Park Now News and Information about Echo Park happenings and history
 Echo Park Online - A social networking site and blogging platform
 Edendale Farm CSA and Learning Center
 Echo Park crime map and statistics

 
Hipster neighborhoods
Neighborhoods in Los Angeles
Landmarks in Los Angeles
Parks in Los Angeles
Central Los Angeles
Northwest Los Angeles
Populated places in the Santa Monica Mountains